Edwin Dixon (1867–1955) was a Reform Party Member of Parliament in New Zealand.

Dixon served as mayor of Hāwera from 1915 to 1923. He won the Patea electorate in a 1921 by-election after the death of the previous MP, Walter Powdrell, but was defeated in the 1922 general election.

In 1953, Dixon was awarded the Queen Elizabeth II Coronation Medal.

References

1867 births
1955 deaths
Reform Party (New Zealand) MPs
Unsuccessful candidates in the 1922 New Zealand general election
Members of the New Zealand House of Representatives
New Zealand MPs for North Island electorates
Mayors of places in Taranaki